Glenmallan is a settlement in Argyll and Bute, Scotland, on the shore of Loch Long. It has a population of under 1000, and its coordinates are latitude 56° 07' 34" N, longitude 4° 48' 54" W.

References

Geography of Argyll and Bute